Ardeparin (trade name Normiflo) is an anticoagulant. It was used for the prevention of deep vein thrombosis, but was withdrawn from the US market in 2000 for reasons unrelated to safety or efficacy.

References

External links 
 

Heparins
Withdrawn drugs